Blendo is a combat robot designed and built by Jamie Hyneman. Adam Savage wired the electronics and control systems.

Blendo had the first effective implementation of the full-body kinetic energy spinner weapon that became common in BattleBots. The robot had a shell made from a wok and was spun by a lawnmower engine. Blades attached to the shell caused damage to its opponents, removing bodywork and in some instances causing them to be thrown over the polycarbonate safety shields into the audience.

Combat performance

Robot Wars
Blendo first competed in the second Robot Wars competition in San Francisco (1995). After two fights (against robots Namreko and DoMore) it was deemed too hazardous to compete by the event supervisors and the insurance company after throwing pieces of its opponents over the arena walls. It was given co-champion status in exchange for withdrawing from the competition. It returned in the fourth Robot Wars in 1997 after the height of the arena walls had been increased to prevent debris from reaching the audience. In this competition, Blendo again fought two robots (Hercules and Punjar), and quickly defeated both. After causing damage to the arena walls in both matches Blendo was again asked to withdraw in exchange for co-champion status.

BattleBots
Blendo would later compete in a total of four BattleBots competitions. However, despite its capacity for extreme violence, Blendo had little success in BattleBots. A combination of a stronger arena design (capable of containing the energy of Blendo) was released, stronger robots were able to take multiple hits from Blendo, similar spinner designs were added, and Blendo's own tendency to tear itself apart caused it to be defeated in its first match in all four BattleBots events in which it competed.

After BattleBots
Blendo's creators Jamie Hyneman and Adam Savage went on to host the Discovery Channel series MythBusters, which also featured fellow combat robot competitor Grant Imahara and his robot, Deadblow.

Blendo is an inaugural member of the Combat Robot Hall of Fame.

References

External links
Account of the match between Hercules and Blendo at RobotCombat.com
Ask Jamie: On Killer Death Robots and Robot Bloodsport, video interview with Jamie Hyneman, July 17 2013, tested.com

BattleBots competitors
Robot Wars (TV series) competitors
Robots of the United States
1995 robots
Rolling robots